The 2013 Winnipeg Blue Bombers season was the 56th season for the team in the Canadian Football League and their 81st overall. The Blue Bombers finished in 4th place in the East Division with a 3–15 record and missed the playoffs for the second straight year. This was the first season for the Blue Bombers at their new stadium, Investors Group Field. Originally, They were supposed to start playing there in 2012, but delays in construction pushed the opening date to 2013.

This was the last season for the Blue Bombers as a member of the East Division, as the Ottawa Redblacks are to take the field in 2014. The Blue Bombers will move back to the West Division after having played in the East Division since the suspension of the Ottawa Renegades in 2006.

Offseason

CFL draft
The 2013 CFL Draft took place on May 6, 2013. The Blue Bombers had six selections in the seven-round draft, after making a single trade, sending their fifth round pick to Saskatchewan.

Preseason

Regular season

Season standings

Season schedule

Roster

Coaching staff

References

Winnipeg Blue Bombers seasons
2013 Canadian Football League season by team